Evan Jenkins may refer to:

Evan Jenkins (politician) (born 1960), American politician from West Virginia
Evan Jenkins (footballer) (1906–1990), Welsh football winger
Evan Meredith Jenkins (1896–1985), British colonial administrator